Sam Chew Jr. (born
August 20, 1942, Philadelphia, Pennsylvania)
is a retired American actor and teacher, likely best-known for his role in Serial (1980), and for playing both John F. Kennedy and Robert F. Kennedy on television.

After more than two decades in film and television, Chew utilized his voice for narrating the Discovery Channel series, Shark Week. He has been a member of the Academy of Motion Picture Arts and Sciences actor's branch for over 30 years. He later became a teacher on the Philadelphia Main Line.

Filmography

References

External links 
 

Male actors from Philadelphia
Living people
American male film actors
American male voice actors
American male television actors
1942 births